Le concert is the first live album from French singer-songwriter Vianney. It was released on 9 November 2018 by Tôt ou tard. The album includes the singles "La même" and "Chanson sur ma drôle de vie". The album has peaked at number 11 on the French Albums Chart.

Singles
"La même" was released as the lead single from the album on 9 March 2018. The song has peaked at number 1 on the French Singles Chart, the song has also charted in Belgium and Switzerland. "Chanson sur ma drôle de vie" was released as the second single from the album on 14 September 2018.

Track listing

Charts

Weekly charts

Year-end charts

Certifications

Release history

References

2018 albums